The common usage of the word is referenced to the several different types of equipment that are used to clean the gutter and sewage systems on a community or industrial level.

Gutter cleaner may also refer to:

 Detergent, made to clean pipes
 Pipe cleaner, a short stiff cotton rod to clean a smoker's pipe, but commonly used to dislodge waste in household pipes
 Gully emptier, a person or machine that cleans gullies or gutters 
 Street sweeper, a person or machine that sweeps gullies or gutters

Sports
 Wicket-keeper, in cricket
 A slang term for the person who does groundskeeping in bowls and cricket, lawn tennis and athletics

See also
Rodding (disambiguation)